Kusaghe is an Oceanic language spoken by about 2,400 people on New Georgia Island, Solomon Islands.

References

Languages of the Solomon Islands
Northwest Solomonic languages